Ilısu (literally "warm water") is a Turkish place name and may refer to:

Ilısu, Aksaray, a town is Güzelyurt district of Aksaray Province, Turkey
 Ilısu, Göynücek, a village in Göynücek district of Amasya Province, Turkey
Ilısu, Gülnar, a village in Gülnar district of Mersin Province, Turkey
İlisu, Azerbaijan
Ilısu, Tercan

Note the difference between the two Turkish 'I's: dotted(i=ee) and dotless (ı=eh) especially in capitals (I,İ)

See also 
Ilısu Dam, a dam under construction in Turkey
 Ilısu Dam Campaign, an international campaign to stop the construction of the dam